Richard Hallorann is a fictional character created by Stephen King from his 1977 novel The Shining. He has telepathic abilities he called "the shining" and is the head chef at the Overlook Hotel. He meets Danny Torrance, a young boy who is also telepathic, and learns that the evil spirits of the hotel have taken control of Danny's father, Jack.

Hallorann is portrayed by Scatman Crothers in Stanley Kubrick's 1980 adaptation of the novel. He was later portrayed by Melvin Van Peebles in the 1997 miniseries adaptation, Arthur Woodley in the 2016 operatic adaptation and Carl Lumbly in the 2019 film Doctor Sleep, an adaptation of the 2013 novel of the same name.

Novels

The Shining
Hallorann first appears in The Shining, where he is the head chef at the Overlook Hotel in Colorado. While packing away for winter one day, Hallorann meets the new caretaker, Jack Torrance and his family: his wife, Wendy and son Danny. Hallorann discovers that Danny carries the same psychic abilities as him. He tells Danny that, when Hallorann was a child, he discovered that he and his grandmother could carry conversations with each other without even moving their lips. She called this telepathy “shining.” Hallorann warns Danny that the Overlook can be dangerous, especially to those who “shine.” Later, Hallorann is contacted by Danny, who reveals that his father had become influenced by Delbert Grady and the other spirits inhabiting the hotel. Hallorann returns to the hotel in an attempt to rescue Danny and Wendy from Jack, and the three of them escape together as the hotel explodes and kills Jack.

It
Hallorann is mentioned in Stephen King's 1986 horror novel, It, as being the founder of The Black Spot, a bar in Derry, Maine which catered towards African-American soldiers and veterans. The Black Spot was eventually burned down in an act of racial hatred by a group titled "The Maine Legion of White Decency". Hallorann uses his Shining ability to find survivors and rescue them, one of them being Will Hanlon, who went on to become the father of Mike Hanlon, a central character in It. It is suggested that the arson of The Black Spot was initiated by Pennywise, the novel's main antagonist. The Black Spot was also referenced in King's novel, Insomnia.

Doctor Sleep
In Stephen King's 2013 sequel, Doctor Sleep, which occurs several years later, Hallorann remains close with Wendy and Danny, and becomes something of a mentor to the latter. One night, Danny wakes up to use the restroom, only to encounter Lorraine Massey, one of the spirits from The Overlook, prompting Wendy to call Hallorann for help. Hallorann reveals that, as a child, he was emotionally, physically and sexually abused by his granduncle, Andy. After Andy's death, Hallorann was haunted by his ghost, but his grandmother taught Hallorann how to lock away such ghosts in an imaginary "lockbox". Hallorann teaches Danny this technique.

Years later, Danny (now going simply by "Dan") attempts to locate Hallorann for help protecting fellow "Shiner" Abra Stone from the True Knot Cult. Dan discovers that Hallorann had died in 1999, but he is still able to communicate with and advise Dan by briefly possessing the body of Eleanor Ouellette, a woman in the hospice where Dan works.

Other media

The Shining (film)

Hallorann was portrayed by musician Scatman Crothers in Stanley Kubrick's 1980 adaptation The Shining. While the film departs from King's novel in many ways (much to King's chagrin), one of the most notable changes is Hallorann's death. In King's novel, Hallorann survives Torrance's rampage. However in the film, Hallorann arrives at The Overlook Hotel after sensing that Danny and Wendy are in danger. Torrance subsequently strikes Halloran in the chest with an axe, killing him. His dead body is then discovered by Wendy when The Overlook attempts to trick her.

Before the role was cast, the original choice for the role of Hallorann was Slim Pickens, who worked with Kubrick on Dr. Strangelove. However, Pickens refused to work with Kubrick again after being annoyed with the director's perfectionism during the filming of that project. The role eventually went to Crothers, who had stated that he had wanted to play the role of Hallorann before the film had even started production. Crothers had a difficult time filming with Kubrick, who had a reputation for repeating takes multiple times to get the perfect shot. For example, Kubrick did 148 takes of the scene in which Hallorann explains The Shining ability to Danny, at the end of which Crothers burst into tears. The shot of Hallorann in a state of shock and horror after being contacted by Danny while staying in Miami also took another 60 takes, which again proved strenuous to Crothers.

The Shining (miniseries)
In Stephen King's 1997 miniseries adaptation of the novel directed by Mick Garris, Hallorann is portrayed by Melvin Van Peebles. In this interpretation, Torrance attacks Halloran with a croquet mallet rather than an axe, and Halloran survives the encounter, as in the novel. While the miniseries itself earned mixed reviews, Van Peebles' performance as Hallorann was critically acclaimed.

The Shining (opera)
Hallorann appears in the operatic adaptation of King's novel portrayed by Arthur Woodley in a baritone part. In this adaptation, he is again attacked with a mallet by Torrance, but is left unconscious and remains in The Overlook Hotel when it explodes.

Doctor Sleep (film)
Similarly to the novel, Hallorann's ghost instructs Dan to use "lockboxes" to lock away the bad apparitions. Hallorann's spirit later appears again to instruct Dan to protect Abra.

Possible Hallorann film
Prior to the release of Doctor Sleep, Warner Bros. had enough confidence in the film that they hired Mike Flanagan to script a prequel focusing on the character, with the working title Hallorann. Following the disappointing box office performance of Doctor Sleep, however, the future of the project is unclear.

Reception
Hallorann's portrayal in the book, as well as the performance by Scatman Crothers, have been positively received by fans. While not as well acclaimed as Crothers' portrayal, Melvin Van Peebles' portrayal of Hallorann in the 1997 miniseries adaptation also received positive reviews.

Hallorann's death in the film adaptation of The Shining is seen as being one of the first movies to start the trope of "The Black Guy Always Dies First In Horror Movies". This is a trope that recognises the fact that African-American or minority characters often do not survive horror movies, and are sometimes the first to be killed off. Despite being the first person killed in The Shining, Hallorann is also the only person (aside from Jack Torrance) to die during the film, and is the only on-screen death.

For his performance as Hallorann, Crothers won the Saturn Award for Best Supporting Actor in 1981, as well as Best Supporting Actor from the Academy of Science Fiction, Fantasy or Horror for his portrayal.

In The Simpsonss Treehouse of Horror parody of The Shining, dubbed "The Shinning", the role of Hallorann is filled by Groundskeeper Willie, who refers to the ability to "Shine" as "The Shinning". Willie is killed by Homer Simpson, who fills in for the role of Jack Torrance. Hallorann is again parodied in the music video for "Spit It Out" by heavy metal band Slipknot. The video parodies the film as a whole, with the band's keyboardist, Craig Jones, filling in for the role of Hallorann in the narrative.

References

The Shining (franchise)
Stephen King characters
Film characters introduced in 1977
Fictional characters from New Hampshire
Fictional African-American people
Black characters in films
Fictional characters with spirit possession or body swapping abilities
Fictional chefs
Fictional ghosts
Fictional telepaths
Fictional United States Army personnel
Male horror film characters
Fictional victims of child sexual abuse